Chief Mofia Tonjo Akobo (died 2020) was a Nigerian politician and campaigner on environmental and resource control issues. He was the first Minister of Petroleum Resources in the Federal government of Nigeria.

Akobo became the Chairman of the Southern Minorities Movement and coordinated the formation of the Union of Niger Delta.

Early life and education 

He was born in Abonnema into the family of Mary John Fyneface of Abonnema and Nathaniel Tonjo Akobo of Tombia. His primary education includes studying at the Bishop Crowther Memorial School Abonnema, Central school Eha-Amufu and Tombia School, Tombia. His secondary education was at the Government College Umuahia from 1949 to 1955 where he became the School Captain (1954/1955). His Tertiary Education was at the University College Ibadan from 1956 to 1960. He also attended the University College hospital from 1960 to 1963, and carried out a Medical Internship at the Lagos University Teaching Hospital from 1963 to 1964.

In 1955, he was awarded the Elder Demster Lines of Unilever Brothers Group scholarship to the United Kingdom for a 3 weeks education tour across London, Liverpool, Brighton and North Wales.

Family 

He was married to Data Ine Akobo,  Amachree, a retired deputy librarian of the Rivers State University of Science and Technology and has children and grandchildren.

Career 

He worked at the Royal Orthopedic Hospital Igbobi Yaba, the General Hospital Marina, Lagos, the Federal Airport Medical Unit Kano, the Five Battalions MRS Kano from 1964 to 1966, the General Hospital Yenegoa, Eastern Nigeria from 1966 to 1968, the General Hospital Aba from April 1968-August 1968 and the 3rd Nigerian Army Medical Corps from September 1968-January 1970.

Politics 

In August 1969, he became the chairman, Rivers State Sports Council and Member Nigeria National Sports Commission, from April 1972 – August 1973. He was Commissioner for Works and later Commissioner for Finance in the Rivers State Executive Council between 1973 and 1974. In 1967–1969, he was part of the Third army commanded by Benjamin Adekunle.

In 1975, he was appointed into the Federal Cabinet as the first minister in charge of the newly created Petroleum and Energy Ministry. In December 1975, as OPEC minister in Vienna, Akobo was part of the ministers held during the Carlos terrorist hijack. He served on General Murtala Mohammed's executive council and was retained by the new head of state General Olusegun Obasanjo but reassigned to the portfolio of economic planning and development until 1977.

 
He concluded signing the contract of the Warri refinery and greatly advanced the development of the Kaduna refinery. He was involved in the establishment of the ECOWAS at the ministerial level and the establishment of the Niger Delta Basin Development Authority.

In 1978, he returned to Port Harcourt to head the group of Medical practice of TEME Clinic Association in Port-Harcourt established by him alongside co-directors, George Organ and Peterside.

With a keen interest in the development of the Niger Delta region, Akobo got involved in the establishment of the IZON National Congress where he was a founding member (1991/92). He was also a founding member of the Movement for National Reformation under the chairmanship of Chief Anthony Enahoro CFR, and the Southern Minorities Movement headed by General David Ejoor. Akobo eventually became Chairman of the Southern Minorities Movement and coordinated the formation of the Union of Niger Delta which was a coalition of movement of Niger Delta region like the Southern Minorities Movement, the Commonwealth of the Niger Delta Coalition, MOSOP and several other ethnic minority movements in the region.

Amongst other involvements as an activist include: 
 Founder and elder council member of the Ijaw National Council.
 Founding member of the Southern Minority Movement.
 Executive member of the Movement for National Reformation headed by Chief Anthony Enahoro and supported by Alfred Rewane.
 Founding member of the Rivers State study group.
 Founding member of the Ijaw Youth Council (IYC).
 Executive member of the Centre for Constitutional Governance (CCG) headed by Beko Ransome-Kuti.
 Founding member of NADECO (National Democratic Coalition).
 Executive delegate member of G34, fractions of which transformed themselves to the PDP (Peoples Democratic Party).

Death
Akobo died on 13 March 2020 after a brief illness and was buried on Saturday 10 October 2020 at his hometown in Tombia, Degema Local Government Area Of Rivers State.

Further reading 

 NIGER DELTA BRIEFS: A Historical Perspective on the Niger Delta (9781797902029): Chief (Dr.) Mofia T. Akobo
 Vanguard on Nigeria: Akobo, Orubebe, others make case on resource Control by Uwakwe Abugu. October 21, 2000
 Conference of nationalities, 'the century- Okota resolutions: communique of the conference' organised by the campaign for democracy Lagos, Nigeria. Held December 17–19, 1998
 Phil Tam Al-Alalibo 'where is the Kalabari Governor of Rivers State?' May 11, 2008
 Presidor Ghomarai ' Ijaw unity imperative now'
 Peter Chalk (2012) 'Encyclopedia of Terrorism' pg 554 Carlos plan hijack of 11 ministers in the 1970s
 Augustine A. Ikein, Diepreye S. P. Alamieyeseigha, Steve S. Azaik (2008) 'Oil, Democracy, and the Promise of True Federalism in Nigeria' page 377 
 David Yallop ‘To the ends of the earth, The Hunt for the Jackal’ published in the UK 2014
 Olusegun Obasanjo (1981) ‘My Command: An Account of the Nigerian Civil War, 1967-1970

References

Year of birth missing
Government College Umuahia alumni
Nigerian activists
Nigerian environmentalists
Petroleum ministers of Nigeria
University of Ibadan alumni
2020 deaths